Marie-Hélène Gaudreau  (born November 24, 1976) is a Canadian politician who was elected to the House of Commons in the 2019 election. She represents Laurentides—Labelle as a member of the Bloc Québécois.

Electoral record

References

External links
 

Bloc Québécois MPs
Members of the House of Commons of Canada from Quebec
Women members of the House of Commons of Canada
21st-century Canadian politicians
21st-century Canadian women politicians
Living people
People from Laurentides
1977 births